Aluminium 7129 alloy is a heat treatable wrought alloy.

Chemical composition

Properties

Applications 
 Aircraft manufacturing sector

References

External links 
 Comparison of 6061 and 7129 alloy
 http://www.matweb.com/search/datasheet.aspx?matguid=d62fafde9ffe4ef68614c5e2ab5869e5

Aluminium–zinc alloys